Protein S deficiency is a disorder associated with increased risk of venous thrombosis. Protein S, a vitamin K-dependent physiological anticoagulant, acts as a nonenzymatic cofactor to activate protein C in the degradation of factor Va and factor VIIIa.

Decreased (antigen) levels or impaired function of protein S leads to decreased degradation of factor Va and factor VIIIa and an increased propensity to venous thrombosis. Some risk factors for deep vein thrombosis or pulmonary embolism in patients with protein S deficiency include pregnancy, older age, hormonal therapy, consumption of birth control pills, recent surgery, trauma, and physical inactivity. Protein S circulates in human plasma in two forms: approximately 60 percent is bound to complement component C4b β-chain while the remaining 40 percent is free, only free protein S has activated protein C cofactor activity

Signs and symptoms
Among the possible presentation of protein S deficiency are:

Cause

In terms of the cause of protein S deficiency it can be in inherited via autosomal dominance. A mutation in the PROS1 gene triggers the condition. The cytogenetic location of the gene in question is chromosome 3, specifically 3q11.1 Protein S deficiency can also be acquired due to vitamin K deficiency, treatment with warfarin, liver disease, kidney disease, chemotherapy, infection, surgery, birth control pills, pregnancy, and acute thrombosis (antiphospholipid antibodies may also be a cause as well)

Pathophysiology
In regards to the mechanism of protein S deficiency, Protein S is made in liver cells and the Endothelium. Protein S is a cofactor of APC both work to degrade factor V and factor VIII. It has been suggested that Zn2+ might be necessary for Protein S binding to factor Xa.

Mutations in this condition change amino acids, which in turn disrupts blood clotting. Functional protein S is lacking, which normally turns off clotting proteins, this increases risk of blood clots.

Diagnosis

The diagnosis for deficiency of protein S can be done via reviewing family history of condition and genetic testing, as well as the following:
 Protein S antigen test
 Coagulation test (prothrombin time test)
 Thrombotic disease investigation
 Factor V Leiden test

Differential diagnosis
Among the possibilities for differential diagnosis of protein S deficiency are- Antiphospholipid syndrome, disseminated intravascular coagulation and antithrombin deficiency (though this list is not exhaustive)

Types
There are three types of hereditary protein S deficiency:
 Type I – decreased protein S activity: decreased total protein S levels, as well as decreased free protein S levels
 Type II – decreased in  regards to the cofactor activity of the protein
 Type III – decreased protein S activity: decreased free protein S levels (normal total protein S levels)

Treatment

In terms of treatment for protein S deficiency the following are consistent with the management (and administration of) individuals with this condition (the prognosis for inherited homozygotes is usually in line with a higher incidence of thrombosis for the affected individual):
Unfractionated heparin (w/ warfarin)
LMWH/Low molecular weight heparin
Dabigatran
Direct Factor Xa Inhibitors
Graduated compressed stocking
High degree of prophylaxis

References

Further reading

External links 
 

Coagulopathies